Drumheller is an extinct town in Franklin County, in the U.S. state of Washington.

A post office called Drumheller was established in 1906 and remained in operation until 1909. The community was named after Sam Drumheller, a local settler.

References

Ghost towns in Washington (state)
Geography of Franklin County, Washington